Antoni Segura (born 9 September 1996) is a Spanish sprint canoeist.

Antoni was a participant of the 2018 ICF CANOE SPRINT WORLD CHAMPIONSHIPS. He won a medal at the 2019 ICF Canoe Sprint World Championships.

References

1996 births
Living people
ICF Canoe Sprint World Championships medalists in Canadian
Spanish male canoeists
21st-century Spanish people